Pachliopta polydorus, the red-bodied swallowtail, is a butterfly from the family Papilionidae found in north-eastern Queensland, Australia and Papua New Guinea.

Description
The forewings are black, with white internervular shading. The hindwings have scalloped edges, are black and have no tails. The hindwing has a line of dark-red postdiscal spots. In the middle of wing there is a big white discal patch. The underside of both wings are the same as the above side, but the underside has brighter red spots. The body is black with a red abdomen. The sexes are alike.

Life history
The larva is mottled brown with the rows of red and yellow fleshy tubercles typical of Troidini. The larval food plants are in the genus Aristolochia - Aristolochia chalmersii, Aristolochia indica, Aristolochia tagala, Aristolochia thozetii, Aristolochia australopithecurus, Aristolochia deltantha, Aristolochia linearifolia, Aristolochia peninsulensis.
The pupa is white with brown marks. The dorsum is concave, and there is a row of flanges along each side. The pupal length is 3 cm.

Distribution
Indonesia (Moluccas (not Morotai, but including Seram and Ambon), Tanimbar, Irian Jaya, Kai, Aru, Waigeu and Skouten Islands), Papua New Guinea, Bismarck Archipelago (including New Britain), Bougainville, Solomons (including San Cristobal and Ulawa Island), Trobriand Islands, D'Entrecasteaux Islands, Louisiade Archipelago and Australia (northern Queensland).

Status
It is generally common and not threatened as a species, though some subspecies may be threatened.

Subspecies
The following subspecies are recognised: (up to thirty-one subspecies are described)

P. p. aignanus  [Rothschild]
P. p. asinius [Fruhstorfer]
P. p. dampierensis [Hagen]
P. p. godartianus [Lucas]
P. p. humboldti  [Rothschild]
P. p. kajelanus [Fruhstorfer]
P. p. lascarus [Fruhstorfer]
P. p. leodamas [Wallace]
P. p. manus [Talbot]
P. p. meforanus [Rothschild]
P. p. naissus [Fruhstorfer]
P. p. novobritannicus [Rothschild]
P. p. orinomus [Rothschild]
P. p. polydaemon [Mathew]
P. p. queenslandicus [Rothschild, 1895]
P. p. septentrionalis [Rothschild]
P. p. tenimberensis [Rothschild]
P. p. thessalia [Swinhoe]
P. p. utuanensis [Ribbe]
P. p. varus [Fruhstorfer]

References

Heidelberger, D., and J. B. Heppner. 1999. Pachliopta polydorus biology in Queensland, Australia (Lepidoptera: Papilionidae). Tropical Lepidoptera 10(1): 18. pdf (pars)

External links
Factsheet
The Global Butterfly Information System Taxonomic history. Images of subspecies.

Butterflies of Australia
Butterflies described in 1763
Pachliopta
Butterflies of Oceania
Taxa named by Carl Linnaeus